Joachim of Fiore, also known as Joachim of Flora and in Italian Gioacchino da Fiore (c. 1135 – 30 March 1202), was an Italian Christian theologian, Catholic abbot, and the founder of the monastic order of San Giovanni in Fiore. According to theologian Bernard McGinn, "Joachim of Fiore is the most important apocalyptic thinker of the whole medieval period." The Divine Comedy of Dante Alighieri is one of the most famous works inspired by his ideas.

Later followers, inspired by his works in Christian eschatology and historicist theories, are called Joachimites.

Biography
Born in the small village of Celico near Cosenza, in Calabria (at the time part of the Kingdom of Sicily), Joachim was the son of Mauro de Celico, a well-placed notary, and of Gemma, his wife. He was educated at Cosenza, where he became first a clerk in the courts, and then a notary himself. In 1166–1167 he worked for Stephen du Perche, archbishop of Palermo (c. 1167–1168) and counsellor of Margaret of Navarre, regent for the young William II of Sicily.

About 1159 he went on pilgrimage to the Holy Land, where he experienced a spiritual crisis and conversion in Jerusalem that turned him away from a worldly life. When he returned, he lived as a hermit for several years, wandering and preaching before joining the Cistercian abbey of Sambucina near Luzzi in Calabria, as a lay brother without taking the religious habit. There he devoted his time to lay preaching. The ecclesiastical authorities raising objections to his mode of life, he joined the monks of the Abbey of Corazzo, and was ordained a priest, apparently in 1168. He applied himself entirely to Biblical study, with a special view to uncovering the arcane meanings he thought were concealed in the Scriptures, especially in the apostle John's Revelation. To his dismay, the monks of Corazzo proclaimed him their abbot (c. 1177). He then attempted to join the monastery to the Cistercian Order, but was refused because of the community's poverty. In the winter of 1178 he appealed in person to William II, who granted the monks some lands.

In 1182 Joachim appealed to Pope Lucius III, who relieved him of the temporal care of his abbey, and warmly approved of his work, bidding him continue it in whatever monastery he thought best. Joachim spent the following year and a half at the Cistercian Abbey of Casamari, where he engaged in writing his three great books. There the young monk, Lucas (afterwards Archbishop of Cosenza), who acted as his secretary, was amazed to see so famous and eloquent a man wearing such rags, and the wonderful devotion with which he preached and said Mass.

In 1184 he was in Rome, interpreting an obscure prophecy found among the papers of Cardinal Matthew of Angers, and was encouraged by Pope Lucius III. Succeeding popes confirmed the papal approbation, though his manuscripts had not begun to circulate.  Joachim retired first to the hermitage of Pietralata, writing all the while, and then founded the Abbey of Fiore (Flora) in the mountains of Calabria. He refused the request of King Tancred of Sicily (r. 1189–1194) to move his new religious foundation to the existing Cistercian monastery of Santa Maria della Matina.

On Good Friday in 1196, Empress Constance, also Queen of Sicily, summoned Joachim of Fiore to Palermo to hear her confession in the Palatine Chapel. Initially the empress sat on a raised chair, but when Joachim told her that as they were at the places of Christ and Mary Magdalene, she needed to lower herself, she sat on the ground.

Fiore became the center of a new and stricter branch of the Cistercian order, approved by Celestine III in 1198.

In 1200 Joachim publicly submitted all his writings to the examination of Innocent III, but died in 1202 before any judgment was passed. The holiness of his life was widely known: Dante affirmed that miracles were said to have been wrought at his tomb, and, though never officially beatified, he is still venerated as a beatus on May 29.

He theorized the dawn of a new age, based on his interpretation of verses in the Book of Revelation, in which the Church would be unnecessary and in which infidels would unite with Christians. Members of the spiritual wing of the Franciscan order acclaimed him as a prophet, however Joachim denied being a prophet himself. His popularity was enormous in the period. Richard the Lionheart met with him in Messina before leaving for the Third Crusade of 1189–1192 to ask for his prophetic advice.

His famous Trinitarian "IEUE" interlaced-circles diagram was influenced by the different 3-circles Tetragrammaton-Trinity diagram of Petrus Alphonsi, and in turn led to the use of the Borromean rings as a symbol of the Christian Trinity (and possibly also influenced the development of the Shield of the Trinity diagram).

Theory of the three ages

The mystical basis of his teaching is his doctrine of the "eternal gospel", founded on an interpretation of Revelation 14:6 (Rev 14:6, "Then I saw another angel flying in midheaven, with an eternal gospel to proclaim to those who live on the earth—to every nation and tribe and language and people." NRSV translation.).

His theories can be considered millenarian; he believed that history, by analogy with the Trinity, was divided into three fundamental epochs:

 The Age of the Father, corresponding to the Old Testament, characterized by obedience of mankind to the Rules of God;
 The Age of the Son, between the advent of Christ and 1260, represented by the New Testament, when Man became the son of God;
 The Age of the Holy Spirit, impending, a contemplative utopia. The Kingdom of the Holy Spirit, a new dispensation of universal love, would proceed from the Gospel of Christ, but transcend the letter of it. In this new Age the ecclesiastical organization would be replaced and the Order of the Just would rule the Church. This Order of the Just was later identified with the Franciscan order by his follower Gerardo of Borgo San Donnino.

Joachim's idea of the Age of the Holy Spirit would also later greatly influence the Cult of the Holy Spirit which would in later centuries have considerable impact in Portugal and its colonies, and would suffer severe persecution by the Portuguese Inquisition.

According to Joachim, only in this third age will it be possible to truly understand the words of God in their deepest meanings, and not merely literally. In this period, instead of the parousia (second Advent of Christ), a new epoch of peace and concord would begin; also, a new religious "order" of spiritual men will arise, thus making the present hierarchy of the Church almost unnecessary.

Joachim distinguished between the "reign of justice" or "of law" in an imperfect society, and the "reign of freedom" in a perfect society.

Joachim saw that a pope will be the Antichrist and that Rome represents Babylon.

Condemnation

Joachim's theories were disputed by Thomas Aquinas in his Summa Theologica (written 1265-1274). In contrast, Dante Alighieri situated Joachim in the Paradiso of his Divine Comedy (composed c. 1320). Among the Spirituals, the stricter branch of the Franciscans, a Joachite group arose, many of whom saw Antichrist already in the world in the person of Frederick II, Holy Roman Emperor (who died in 1250).

As the appointed year approached, spurious works began to circulate under Joachim's name: De Oneribus Prophetarum, an Expositio Sybillae et Merlini ("Exposition of the Sibyl and Merlin") and commentaries on the prophecies of Jeremiah and Isaiah. The Fourth Council of the Lateran, in 1215, condemned some of his ideas about the nature of the Trinity. In 1263, the archbishop Fiorenzo enhanced the condemnation of his writings and those of his follower Gerardo of Borgo San Donnino, joining a commission in the Synod of Arles, in which Joachim's theories were declared heretical. The accusation was of having an unorthodox view of the Holy Trinity.

His views also inspired several subsequent movements: the Amalricians, the Dulcinians and the Brethren of the Free Spirit. All of these were eventually declared heretical by the Catholic Church. Joachimite interpretations became popular in the Protestant reformation, and even influenced some Protestant interpretations. Joachim also possibly influenced Dante.

Of importance is the fact that Joachim himself was never condemned as a heretic by the Church; rather, the ideas and movement surrounding him were condemned. Joachim the man was held in high regard during his lifetime.

Literary references
The Divine Comedy of Dante Alighieri is largely inspired to the ideas of the Abbot by means of the interpretation given by his follower Pietro di Giovanni Olivi, active in Florence at the end of the XIII century.

W. B. Yeats's short story "The Tables of the Law" tells about a single surviving copy of a certain book by Joachim of Flora and its powerful effects on its owner. For full discussion see Warwick Gould and Marjorie Reeves, Joachim of Fiore and the Myth of the Eternal Evangel in the Nineteenth and Twentieth Centuries (Oxford: Clarendon, 2001), rev & enlarged ed., Ch ix, "W. B. Yeats: a Noble Antinomianism", pp. 221–298.

Joachim, referred to as Joachim Abbas, is referenced in James Joyce's Ulysses and Giacomo Joyce.

Joachim is mentioned in Umberto Eco's medieval mystery The Name of the Rose. His influence on the Franciscan Spirituals and the rediscovery of his books foreseeing the advent of a new age are part of the book's background story in which an inquisitorial debate is held in a remote monastery where a number of murders take place.

The sprawling conspiracy satire entitled the Illuminatus! trilogy of novels by Robert Anton Wilson and Robert Shea also reference Joachim of Fiore repeatedly. His writings fit well with the eschatological tone of the story. The authors attempt to confuse matters and give an air of authenticity to the madness of the various plotlines by including references to real people and events.

A hoax circulated that Barack Obama referred to Joachim's third age three times in his campaign speeches during the 2008 presidential election. He is said to have spoken of him as a master of contemporary civilization who had sought to create a better world, but there is no evidence Obama ever quoted or mentioned Joachim.

Works

Liber Concordiae Novi ac Veteris Testamenti (Harmony of the Old and New Testaments/Book of Concordance), completed in 1200.
Expositio in Apocalipsim (Exposition of the Book of Revelation), finished around 1196–1199. The Liber introductoris in Apocalypsim, sometimes cited as a separate work, forms an introduction to this.
Psalterium Decem Cordarum (Psaltery of Ten Strings).
Tractatus super quatuor Evangelia (Treatise on the four Gospels).

Lesser works include:
Genealogia (Genealogy), written about 1176.
De prophetia ignota, dateable to 1184.
Adversus Judeos (also known as Exhortatorium Iudeorum), probably written in the early 1180s.
De articulis fidei, probably written in the early 1180s.
Professio fidei, probably written in the early 1180s.
Tractatus in expositionem vite et regule beati Benedicti, sermons belonging to the late 1180s.
Praephatio super Apocalipsim. Written around 1188–1192.
Intelligentia super calathis. Written in 1190–1.
De ultimis tribulationibus, which is a short sermon by Joachim.
Enchiridion super Apocalypsim. Written in 1194-6, this is an earlier and shorter version of the Liber introductorius that prefaces Joachim's Expositio in Apocalipsim.
De septem sigillis. It is uncertain when this was written.
The Liber figurarum was drawn together soon after Joachim's death in 1202, and is a collection of 24 'figurae' drawn by Joachim. The name was used in thirteenth-century manuscripts to describe a work attributed to Joachim of Fiore, but it was only in the mid-twentieth century that it was identified in relation to three extant manuscripts.
 The late thirteenth-century set of pseudo-prophecies, united with a later series under the title Vaticinia de Summis Pontificibus was falsely attributed to Joachim of Fiore without any basis in truth.<ref>{{cite web |url=http://www.research-projects.unizh.ch/p2061.htm |title=Frank Schleich, Ascende calve: the later series of the medieval pope prophecies |access-date=September 2, 2016}}</ref>

See also
 Cult of the Holy Spirit
 Ernesto Buonaiuti (one of the first researchers in Joachinism)
 List of Christian mystics
 Vaticinia de Summis Pontificibus

Notes

Further reading
Thomas Gil, "Zeitkonstruktion als Kampf- und Protestmittel: Reflexionen über Joachim's von Fiore Trinitätstheologische Geschichtskonstruktion und deren Wirkungsgeschichte." In Constructions of Time in the Late Middle Ages, ed. Carol Poster and Richard Utz (Evanston, IL: Northwestern University Press, 1997), pp. 35–49.
Warwick Gould and Marjorie Reeves,  Joachim of Fiore and the Myth of the Eternal Evangel in the Nineteenth and Twentieth Centuries  (Oxford: Clarendon, 2001), rev & enlarged from 1987 ed.
Henri de Lubac, La Postérité spirituelle de Joachim de Flore, Lethielleux, 1979 and 1981 
Marjorie Reeves, Joachim of Fiore & the prophetic future : a medieval study in historical thinking, 	Stroud : Sutton Pub., 1999.
Matthias Riedl, Joachim von Fiore. Denker der vollendeten Menschheit, Koenigshausen & Neumann, 2004. 
Gian Luca Potestà, Il Tempo dell'apocalisse - Vita di Gioacchino da Fiore, Laterza, Bari, 2004.
Valeria de Fraja, Oltre Cîteaux. Gioacchino da Fiore e l'ordine florense, Viella, Roma 2006.
E. Randolph Daniel, Abbot Joachim of Fiore and Joachimism, Variorum Collected Studies Series, Ashgate Publishing Ltd., 2011.
P. Lopetrone, L'effigie dell'abate Gioacchino da Fiore", in Vivarium, Rivista di Scienze Teologiche dell'Istituto Teologico S. Pio X di Catanzaro, Anno XX, n. 3, Edizioni Pubblisfera 2013, pp. 361–386.
"The Eternal Gospel" by Leoš Janáček, a 1913 composition described as A legend for soprano, tenor, chorus and orchestra.

External links

International Center for Joachimist Studies 
Joachim of Fiore's Constitution of Future Society
Joachim of Fiore's circles diagram and Trinitarian symbolism
Neo-Joachimism 

1130s births
1202 deaths
12th-century apocalypticists
12th-century Christian mystics
12th-century Latin writers
12th-century Italian Roman Catholic theologians
Italian abbots
Italian Christian monks
People from the Province of Cosenza
Roman Catholic mystics
Proto-Protestants
Monastic theologians